Rudy Pévenage (15 June 1954) is a former Belgian cyclist, and later in his career team coach of cycling teams such as , , , and .

Pévenage was a professional cyclist from 1976 until 1988. His largest success was in the 1980 Tour de France: he won one stage and won the points classification. He reached second place in the 1979 Tour de Suisse. He also spent nine days in the yellow jersey, leading the general classification in the Tour de France. His nickname was de rosse van Moerbeke.

After his cycling career, Pévenage became a team manager. Pévenage was team manager of Deutsche Telekom when Jan Ullrich started his career. In 2002, when Ullrich was forced to leave the team, Pévenage followed Ullrich to his new team Bianchi. After a good 2003 Tour de France, Ullrich returned to Telekom, without Pévenage. In 2006, Pévenage returned to Telekom (then renamed T-Mobile). When Ullrich was suspected of using illegal doping in Operación Puerto and was fired by T-Mobile Team, Pévenage also had to leave. He was rumoured to have worked as a connection between Ullrich and the Spanish Eufemiano Fuentes.

Major results
Source:

1976
 2nd Ronde van Vlaanderen U23
 3rd Circuit de Wallonie
 7th Druivenkoers Overijse
1977
 2nd  Le Samyn
 3rd Overall Ronde van Nederland
1st Stage 5
 3rd Omloop van Oost-Vlaanderen
 4th Leeuwse Pijl
 6th Milano–Torino
 7th Dwars door België
 7th Brussels Cycling Classic
 9th Overall Tour de Luxembourg
 9th Paris–Tours
1978
 2nd Leeuwse Pijl
 3rd Overall Ronde van Nederland
 3rd Ronde van Limburg
 4th  Grand Prix Pino Cerami
 7th Trofeo Laigueglia
1979
 1st Stage 1 (TTT) Vuelta a Andalucia Ruta Ciclista Del Sol
 2nd Overall Tour de Suisse
 3rd Circuit des Frontières
 4th Grand Prix of Aargau Canton
1980
 1st  Points classification Tour de France
1st Stage 2
 2nd Druivenkoers Overijse
 4th Brabantse Pijl
 6th Eschborn–Frankfurt
 8th Züri-Metzgete
 10th E3 Prijs Vlaanderen
1981
 1st Tour de Berne
 1st Druivenkoers Overijse
 1st Omloop van het Houtland
 2nd 1981 Grote Prijs Jef Scherens
 4th 1981 Amstel Gold Race
 4th Kuurne–Brussels–Kuurne
 4th Brussels Cycling Classic
 5th Grand Prix de Fourmies
 7th Liège–Bastogne–Liège
 7th La Flèche Wallonne
 9th Nokere Koerse
 9th Kampioenschap van Vlaanderen
1982
 3rd Tour of Flanders
 4th Tour de Berne
 4th Grand Prix de Wallonie
 4th Brussels Cycling Classic
 6th Overall Setmana Catalana de Ciclisme
 6th E3 Prijs Vlaanderen
 6th Trofeo Laigueglia
1983
 3rd Coppa Bernocchi
 6th Milano–Torino
1984
 2nd Trofeo Pantalica
 2nd GP Montelupo
 4th Trofeo Laigueglia
 7th Coppa Sabatini
1985
 1st Stage 2 (TTT) Giro d'Italia
 9th Züri-Metzgete

General classification results timeline

References

External links
Official Tour de France results for Rudy Pevenage

Belgian male cyclists
Belgian Tour de France stage winners
Living people
1954 births
Cyclists from East Flanders
People from Geraardsbergen